Colemore is a hamlet and former village in the Hampshire Downs about  northwest of Petersfield. It was united with Priors Dean to form the civil parish of Colemore and Priors Dean in 1932.

Colemore is a largely abandoned village. There were houses southwest of the parish church and southeast of manor farm. The land where they stood is now a Scheduled Ancient Monument.

Manor Farmhouse is an early 17th-century brick house, altered in the middle of the 19th century.

The earliest parts of the former Church of England parish church of St Peter ad Vincula ("St Peter in Chains") are 11th-century. It is a Grade II* listed building. It is now redundant and in the care of the Churches Conservation Trust.

The brothers John Greaves (1602–52, mathematician), Edward Greaves (1608–80, physician) and Thomas Greaves (1612–76, orientalist) were all sons of a rector of the parish and born in the village. A later orientalist, Richard Pococke (1704–65), was also the son of a rector of the parish.

References

Sources and further reading

External links

Villages in Hampshire